Rosita Rota Gelpi (born 6 November 1973) is a former Italian female mountain runner who won two World Mountain Running Championships (1999, 2004).

Biography
She won also two national championships at individual senior level. She competed at four editions of the IAAF World Cross Country Championships at senior level (2001, 2002, 2003).

Achievements

Team results
World Mountain Running Championships
 1999, 2001, 2002, 2004
 1996, 1997, 2000
European Mountain Running Championships
 1998, 2000, 2004

National titles
Italian Mountain Running Championships
1998, 1999

References

External links
 
 Rosita Rota Gelpi at Unione Sportiva Derviese

1973 births
Living people
Italian female mountain runners
Italian female long-distance runners
Athletics competitors of Gruppo Sportivo Forestale
World Mountain Running Championships winners
Sportspeople from Lecco